This is a list of copper mines and lists operating, closed and planned mines that have substantial copper output.

Africa/Middle East

Democratic Republic of the Congo

Eritrea

 Misha mines

Iran 

 Sarcheshmeh

Saudi Arabia 

 Jabal Sayid mine

South Africa

 Palabora mine
 jaydeep

Zambia

 Sentinel mine
 Kansanshi Mine
 Lubambe mine
 Luanshya mine
 Chibuluma Mine
 Chambishi Mines
 Lumwana mine
 Mufulira Mine
 Nkana Mine
 Nchanga Mines
 Rokana
 Konkola

Mauritania

 Guelb Moghreine

Asia/Pacific Rim

Afghanistan
 Mes Aynak
 Shaida Copper Mine

Australia

 Mount Isa Mines
 Northparkes mine
 Olympic Dam mine

Bougainville Island
 Bougainville Copper (abandoned)

Indonesia

 Batu Hijau mine
 Grasberg mine

Mongolia
Erdenet mining corporation
 Oyu Tolgoi mine

Myanmar/Burma

 Myanmar Wanbao Copper Mining Limited
 Myanmar Yang Tse Copper Limited

Europe

Cyprus
 Skouriotissa (the oldest operating mine in the world) 
 Tamassos
 Kambia
 Kalavassos
 Limni

Finland
 Kevitsa mine

Poland
 OZG Rudna
 Zakłady Górnicze Lubin
 OZG Polkowice-Sieroszowice

Romania
 Roșia Poieni copper mine

Serbia
 RTB Bor

Sweden
 Aitik
 Garpenberg
 Bolidenområdet

United Kingdom
Alderley Edge Mines

North America

Canada

 Coleman Mine
 Copper Mountain mine
 Duck Pond mine
 Galore Creek mine
 Gibraltar Mine
 Highland Valley Copper mine
 Huckleberry mine
 Kidd Creek mine
 Mount Polley mine
 New Afton mine
 Red Chris Mine
 Schaft Creek

United States

 Adventure mine
 Bagdad mine
 Bingham Canyon Mine
 Cliff mine
 El Chino Mine
 Kennecott
 Morenci Mine
 Mohawk Mine
 Pebble Mine
 Quincy Mine
 Rosemont Ranch mine
 Safford Mine
 Tyrone mine

Mexico 

 Buenavista mine
 El Arco mine
 El Pilar mine
 La Caridad Mine

South America

Argentina

 Alumbrera mine

Brazil

 Serrote mine
 Sossego mine

Chile

 Candelaria mine
 Carmen de Andacollo mine
 Collahuasi mine
 El Abra mine
 El Teniente underground mine
 Escondida mine
 Quebrada Blanca mine
 Tres Valles mine
 Zaldivar
 Chuquicamata
 Los Pelambres
 Los Bronces
 Esperanza
 Sierra Gorda Copper Mine Project

Peru

 Antamina mine
 Austria Duvaz Morococha copper mine
 Cobriza mine
 Cerro Corona mine
 Constancia mine
 Cerro Verde Copper-Molybdenum Mine
 La Granja mine
 Las Bambas copper mine
 Quellaveco mine
 Toquepala mine
 Toromocho mine
 Tintaya mine
 Tia Maria mine

See also
List of countries by copper production
List of copper production by company

References

Copper mines